Navunda  is a village in the southern state of Karnataka, India. It is located in the Byndoor taluk of Udupi district in Karnataka.(shrish)

Demographics
As of 2001 India census, Navunda had a population of 5496 with 2502 males and 2994 females.

See also
 Udupi
 Byndoor
 Districts of Karnataka
 Kollur
 Murdeshwara

References

External links
 http://Udupi.nic.in/

Villages in Udupi district